Donnez is a Swedish dansband from Perstorp, Skåne, Sweden established in 2000. The band has Donald "Donne" Laitila as kapellmeister, and on keyboard and accordion and vocals, Andy Ekenmo on vocals and drums, Johan Karlsson on guitar and bass/base and vocals, Daniel "Putte" Högå Thofvesson on saxophone and keyboard.

In 2010, they took in the Dansbandskampen, a danceband competition show putting bands to compete against each other on Swedish television station SVT1

In July 2016, Donnez played their first live shows ever in the United States when they headlined the 15th annual three-day Scandinavian Folk Festival near Jamestown, New York. Jamestown was the destination of many Swedish immigrants during the late 1800s and early 1900s.

Discography

Albums

References

External links
Official website
Facebook
Last.fm

Dansbands
2000 establishments in Sweden
Musical groups established in 2000